The Lauritsen Cabin is a historic miner's cabin in the Chugach Mountains of the Kenai Peninsula in south-central Alaska. It is located a short way east of mile 48 of the Seward Highway, at the confluence of Mill and Canyon Creeks. It is built of hand-hewn logs fitted tightly with dovetail notches, and features a ridge pole hewn in a curve to provide for a hip-shaped roof. The cabin was built in 1896, and may have been among the first cabins built in the gold rush that swept the area in the late 19th century.

The cabin was listed on the National Register of Historic Places in 1979.

See also
National Register of Historic Places listings in Kenai Peninsula Borough, Alaska

References

Houses on the National Register of Historic Places in Alaska
Houses completed in 1896
Houses in Kenai Peninsula Borough, Alaska
Buildings and structures on the National Register of Historic Places in Kenai Peninsula Borough, Alaska